The ZX Interface 2 is a peripheral from Sinclair Research for its ZX Spectrum home computer released in September 1983.  It has two joystick ports and a ROM cartridge slot, which offers instant loading times. The joystick ports are not compatible with the popular Kempston interface, and thus do not work with most Spectrum games released prior to the launch of the ZX Interface 2. In addition, the pass-through expansion bus provided was stripped, only allowing a ZX Printer to be attached.

Released titles 

Availability of cartridge software is very limited:  The cost was almost twice as much as the same game on cassette tape, and each cartridge can only hold 16 KiB, making it almost immediately obsolete as the majority of Spectrums sold were 48K-models, which the software publishers targeted.

Only ten games were commercially released:

 Jetpac
 PSSST
 Cookie
 Tranz Am
 Chess
 Backgammon
 Hungry Horace
 Horace and the Spiders
 Planetoids
 Space Raiders

Paul Farrow has demonstrated that it is possible to produce custom ROM cartridges, including the ability to exceed the 16 KiB design limitation of the ROM cartridges.

Joystick ports

The interface two comes with two joystick ports that (unlike the Kempston which used the IN31 command) are mapped to actual key presses.  Player 1 is mapped to – and player 2 is mapped to –.  This initially seemed at odds with Sinclair's own keyboard layout, given that the keyboard itself has the cursor keys mapped to – with  typically being used by games as a fire button. Joystick interfaces that mapped to the cursor keys are available, but like the popular Kempston interface they are limited to supporting a single joystick only. It is the twin joystick feature of the ZX Interface 2 that turned out to be its major selling point.

See also
ZX Interface 1 — a peripheral with ports for ZX Microdrives, RS-232 serial units, and ZX Net cables (for connection to a ZX Net local area network)

External links
 Detailed information on Interface 2
 List of ROM cartridges available for Interface 2
 Information at Planet Sinclair
 Hardware feature from Sinclair User — December 1983

Notes 

Home computer peripherals
ZX Spectrum
Computer-related introductions in 1983

de:Sinclair ZX Spectrum#ZX Interface 2